Markus Björkqvist (born 4 September 2003) is a Swedish professional football player who plays for Utsikten, on loan from Malmö FF.

Club career 
Björkqvist started playing football at Bara GIF, before joining Malmö FF aged eleven.

After signing his first contract with the Swedish champions in June 2021, Björkqvist made his professional debut for the club on the following 24 July, coming on as substitute in 2-0 away Allsvenskan win against Mjällby.

Honours

Malmö FF
 Allsvenskan: 2021

References

External links

2003 births
Living people
Swedish footballers
Sweden youth international footballers
Association football midfielders
Footballers from Malmö
Malmö FF players
Allsvenskan players